The Ahuriri River is a river in the Canterbury and Otago Regions of the South Island of New Zealand.

The headwaters are on the eastern flanks of the Southern Alps. The river flows for  through the southernmost part of the Mackenzie Basin before reaching the Ahuriri Arm of Lake Benmore, one of the lakes in the Waitaki hydroelectric project. From there, the waters join with those of the Waitaki, which has its outflow in the Pacific Ocean.

Much of the upper portion of the river is in the Ahuriri Conservation Park, and it is a well-regarded fly fishing river, supporting both brown and rainbow trout.

A notable rock formation, the Omarama or Ahuriri River Clay Cliffs, is located close to the river's north bank some 10 kilometres west of the township of Omarama. Omarama is the main settlement close to the river.

References

Rivers of Canterbury, New Zealand
Rivers of Otago
Rivers of New Zealand